The Long Strike is a 1911 silent film drama short produced by the Essanay Studios. It was distributed by the General Film Company.

Cast
Francis X. Bushman - Jim Blakely
Bryant Washburn - Bert Readly
Harry Cashman - Noah Dixon
Tom Shirley - Bob Dixon (*Tommy Shirley)

See also
Francis X. Bushman filmography

References

External links
 The Long Strike at IMDb.com

1911 films
Essanay Studios films
1911 short films
American silent short films
Silent American drama films
1911 drama films
American black-and-white films
1910s American films